The 2013 Russian Figure Skating Championships was held from 25–28 December 2012 in Sochi. Medals were awarded in the disciplines of men's singles, ladies' singles, pair skating, and ice dancing. The results are among the criteria used to select Russia's teams sent to the 2013 World Championships and 2013 European Championships.

Competitions

Medalists of most important competitions

Senior Championships
The list of entries was announced on 13 December 2012. Yulia Lipnitskaya, Polina Shelepen, and Uliana Titushkina withdrew from the ladies' event to recover from injuries and were replaced by the three reserves, Tatiana Fedoseeva, Julia Li, and Nikol Gosviani. Vera Bazarova / Yuri Larionov withdrew from the pairs' event. Aleksandr Gorshkov said that Larionov had boot problems and could not endanger his partner. They were replaced by Anastasia A. Gubanova / Alexei Sintsov. Artem Borodulin withdrew from the men's event and was replaced by Adian Pitkeev. Kristina Gorshkova / Vitali Butikov withdrew from the ice dancing event but were not replaced due to a lack of reserves. Officials decided to test a new security system involving a background check at the event. A couple of minor earthquakes occurred in Sochi but not during any skating. One occurred before the event. Another quake occurred at 2:30 am on 26 December – its epicenter was more than 150 kilometers (93 miles) away in the Black Sea.

Evgeni Plushenko took the lead in the men's short program, with Sergei Voronov and Maxim Kovtun in second and third respectively. Plushenko also placed first in the free skating and took his 10th national title, while Voronov took silver and Konstantin Menshov the bronze.

Ekaterina Bobrova / Dmitri Soloviev were first in the short dance, followed by Elena Ilinykh / Nikita Katsalapov and Ksenia Monko / Kirill Khaliavin. Bobrova / Soloviev also placed first in the free dance and won their third national title, while Ilinykh / Katsalapov repeated as silver medalists and Ekaterina Riazanova / Ilia Tkachenko as bronze medalists.

Elizaveta Tuktamysheva took the lead in the ladies' short program ahead of three-time champion Adelina Sotnikova and Elena Radionova. Tuktamysheva fell ill before the free skating and her coach Alexei Mishin initially indicated that she would withdraw, but later she and her team decided she would compete. Tuktamysheva said, "I might find myself in an even worse situation in the future. I have to know how to handle it, so we decided to skate." She won her first national title, while Radionova won silver in her second appearance at the event and Sotnikova took the bronze.

Tatiana Volosozhar / Maxim Trankov placed first in the pairs' short program, ahead of Yuko Kavaguti / Alexander Smirnov and Ksenia Stolbova / Fedor Klimov. Volosozhar / Trankov won their second national title, Kavaguti / Smirnov won silver, and Stolbova / Klimov the bronze.

Russia's team for the 2013 European Championships was announced on 28 December:
 Men: Plushenko, Voronov, Kovtun
 Ladies: Tuktamysheva, Sotnikova, Gosviani
 Pairs: Volosozhar / Trankov, Kavaguti / Smirnov, Bazarova / Larionov
 Ice dancing: Bobrova / Soloviev, Ilinykh / Katsalapov, Riazanova / Tkachenko
The president of the Russian skating federation, Aleksandr Gorshkov, said the results of the European Championships and Russian Cup Final would be considered in selecting the team to the 2013 World Championships.

Schedule
 Tuesday, December 25
 14:00–14:30 – Opening ceremony
 14:45–16:15 – Short dance
 16:30–18:30 – Pairs' short
 18:45–21:15 – Men's short
 Wednesday, December 26
 14:00–16:30 – Ladies' short
 16:45–19:45 – Men's free
 20:00–22:00 – Free dance
 Thursday, December 27
 16:00–18:25 – Pairs' free
 18:40–21:30 – Ladies' free
 Friday, December 28
 14:00–14:30 – Medal ceremonies
 14:45–17:15 – Exhibitions

Results

Men

Ladies

Pairs

Ice dancing

Junior Championships
The 2013 Russian Junior Championships were held from 31 January to 3 February 2013 in Saransk.

Mikhail Kolyada won the junior men's title while Alexander Samarin and Alexander Petrov won silver and bronze respectively.

JGP Final champion Elena Radionova won the junior ladies' event ahead of Serafima Sakhanovich and Maria Sotskova, both of whom were age-ineligible for junior internationals. 2012 World Junior champion Yulia Lipnitskaya finished 5th in her first competition since recovering from a concussion.

JGP Final champions Lina Fedorova / Maxim Miroshkin took the junior pairs' title, with silver going to Evgenia Tarasova / Vladimir Morozov, who had finished ahead of them at the senior Russian Championships. The winners attempted no side-by-side triples but the silver and bronze medalists successfully performed at least one set. Kamilla Gainetdinova / Ivan Bich landed a SBS triple lutz, double toe combination at the start of their program and SBS triple toes after the half-way mark. They beat the JGP Final bronze medalists, Maria Vigalova / Egor Zakroev, for the bronze. JGP Final silver medalists Vasilisa Davankova / Andrei Deputat withdrew due to Davankova's leg injury.

JGP Final champions Alexandra Stepanova / Ivan Bukin withdrew due to Bukin's sinusitis. They were automatically named in the Russian team to Junior Worlds. In their absence, Valeria Zenkova / Valerie Sinitsin won the junior ice dancing title ahead of Evgenia Kosigina / Nikolai Moroshkin and Anna Yanovskaia / Sergei Mozgov.

The team to the 2013 World Junior Championships was announced on 5 February 2013. 
 Men: Kolyada, Samarin
 Ladies: Radionova, Lipnitskaia, Pogorilaya
 Pairs: Fedorova / Miroshkin, Tarasova / Morozov, Gainetdinova / Bich 
 Ice dancing: Zenkova / Sinitsin, Kosigina / Moroshkin, Stepanova / Bukin

Results

Men

Ladies

Pairs

Ice dancing

References

External links
 Senior results (Protocols)
 Junior results (Protocols)
 Figure Skating Federation of Russia

Russian Figure Skating Championships
Russian Championships
Russian Championships
Figure Skating Championships
Figure Skating Championships